Johann Joachim Spalding (1 November 1714 – 25 May 1804) was a German Protestant theologian and philosopher of Scottish ancestry who was a native of Tribsees, Swedish Pomerania. He was the father of Georg Ludwig Spalding (1762–1811), a professor at Grauen Kloster in Berlin.

He grew up as a son of the parish priest in Tribsees  and studied himself philosophy and theology at the Universities of Rostock and Greifswald, afterwards working as an auxiliary preacher in his hometown of Tribsees. In 1755 he became a pastor in Lassan, then two years later served as a minister in the town of Barth.

In 1764 he received the titles of provost and Oberkonsistorialrat, and gained recognition for his sermons at St. Nicolai-Kirche and at Marienkirche in Berlin. He was a highly influential minister who had as friends, renowned personalities that included Ewald Christian von Kleist and Johann Wilhelm Ludwig Gleim. As a protest against the Wöllnersche Religionsedikt (Wöllner Edict of 9 July 1788), he resigned from his official duties.

Spalding was an important figure of the German Enlightenment. In 1748 he released Betrachtungen über die Bestimmung des Menschen (Reflections on the Destination of Man), a publication that is considered to be a manifesto of German Enlightenment theology. In this work he rejected dogmatic authoritarianism and confessional orthodoxy, while promoting a common sense philosophy that explained an individual's path from sensuality to spirituality ultimately leading to immortality.

In his writings he was strongly opposed to Julien Offroy de La Mettrie's philosophy of French materialism. His autobiography, Lebensbeschreibung, von ihm selbst aufgesetzt, was published by his son in 1804. Other noted works by Spalding include:
 Über die Nutzbarkeit des Predigtamtes und deren Beförderung, 1772.
 Gedanken über den Werth der Gefühle in dem Christenthum, 1789 – Thoughts concerning the value of feelings in Christianity.
 Vertraute Briefe, die Religion betreffend : (1784; 1785; 1788) – Familiar writings involving religion.
 Religion, eine Angelegenheit des Menschen, 1798 – Religion, A matter for mankind.

References 
 "This article is based on a translation of an equivalent article at the German Wikipedia", whose references include: ADB: Spalding, Johann Joachim @ Allgemeine Deutsche Biographie.

1714 births
1804 deaths
People from Vorpommern-Rügen
People from Swedish Pomerania
German Protestant clergy
German philosophers
German male non-fiction writers